Mohammadabad (also Romanized as Moḩammadābād) is a village in Khorram Dasht Rural District, Kamareh District, Khomeyn County, Markazi Province, Iran. At the 2006 census, its population was 184, in 46 families.

References 

Populated places in Khomeyn County